Jacques Foix (26 November 1930 – 14 June 2017) was a French footballer who played striker. His playing career spanned from 1951 to 1964. Foix made seven appearances for the France national team between 1953 and 1956, scoring three goals and was a member of two French League championship squads in 1959 and 1964.

Foix died 14 June 2017 at age 86.

References

External links
Profile
Profile

1930 births
2017 deaths
People from Mont-de-Marsan
French footballers
France international footballers
Association football forwards
Racing Club de France Football players
AS Saint-Étienne players
OGC Nice players
Ligue 1 players
Sportspeople from Landes (department)
Footballers from Nouvelle-Aquitaine